is a retired Japanese pitcher who played his entire career in Nippon Professional Baseball for the Orix Buffaloes in Japan's Pacific League.

Career
He was drafted in the 2006 NPB Draft by the Orix Buffaloes after pitching for Japan in the 2006 Asian Games.

In  2007, Komatsu was 1-0 with a 2.53 ERA in eight relief appearances, striking out 13 in 10 IP. He had a huge year in 2008, going 15-3 for a team that was otherwise under .500; he had a 2.51 ERA and allowed 134 hits in 172 IP. 
He finished third in the Pacific League in ERA and wins, behind Hisashi Iwakuma and Yu Darvish in both categories. His 151 strikeouts placed him 5th and was named Rookie of the Year that season, being a unanimous pick.

External links

NPB

Living people
1981 births
Baseball people from Fukushima Prefecture
Japanese baseball players
Nippon Professional Baseball pitchers
Orix Buffaloes players
2009 World Baseball Classic players
Nippon Professional Baseball Rookie of the Year Award winners
Asian Games medalists in baseball
Baseball players at the 2006 Asian Games
Asian Games silver medalists for Japan
Medalists at the 2006 Asian Games
Japanese baseball coaches
Nippon Professional Baseball coaches